M.E.T.R.O. – Ein Team auf Leben und Tod is a German television series.

See also
List of German television series

External links
 

2006 German television series debuts
2006 German television series endings
German crime television series
German medical television series
German-language television shows
ZDF original programming